Sébastien Huberdeau (born 30 November 1978) is a Canadian actor. He studied political science at university. He has played in a rendition of the play Talk Radio and was seen on screens abroad in The Barbarian Invasions (Les Invasions barbares), winner of the 2004 Academy Award for Best Foreign Language Film. Huberdeau was nominated in 2000 for a Jutra Award for his role in Sable Island (L'Île de sable). He is known to enjoy parachuting and fencing.

Filmography

Movies 
Sable Island (L'Île de sable), 1999
Memories Unlocked (Souvenirs intimes), 1999
Yellowknife, 2002
The Barbarian Invasions (Les Invasions barbares), 2003
The Last Tunnel (Le Dernier tunnel), 2004
Battle of the Brave (Nouvelle-France), 2004
Family History (Histoire de famille), 2006
The Beautiful Beast (La Belle bête), 2006
Polytechnique, 2009
Thelma, Louise et Chantal, 2010
Silence Lies (Tromper le silence), 2010
Angle mort, 2011
Iqaluit, 2016

Television 
La Job (2006)
Les Hauts et les bas de Sophie Paquin (2006)
Virginie (2005)
Un monde à part (2004)
Dangerous Liaisons (2003) (Les Liaisons dangereuses)
Willie (2000)
Le Monde de Charlotte (2000)
Gypsies (2000)
Tag (2000)

See also 
List of Quebec actors
Cinema of Quebec
Television of Quebec
Culture of Quebec

External links

1979 births
Living people
French Quebecers
Canadian male film actors
Canadian male television actors